Scrippsia is a genus of hydrozoans in the family Corynidae. It is monotypic with only one species, Scrippsia pacifica.

References

Monotypic cnidarian genera
Animals described in 1909
Corynidae
Hydrozoan genera